Quang H. Nguyen (born 1962) is a Vietnamese-American businessman and politician serving as a Republican member of the Arizona House of Representatives for District 1 since 2021. The district includes most of Yavapai County and some of Maricopa County.

Early life and education
Quang Nguyen was born in South Vietnam in 1962 and left at 12 years old after the fall of Saigon. Nguyen graduated from California State University, Long Beach with a bachelor's degree in technology education.

Arizona House of Representatives
Nguyen first ran for Arizona House of Representatives in District 1 in 2020. Prior to becoming an elected official, Nguyen founded marketing firm Caddis Advertising. He was also active in public speaking and conservative causes. He placed first in a crowded Republican primary with 30.4% of the total vote. Along with Judy Burges, he won the general election and defeated Democrat Judy Stahl.

Tenure
Amid the COVID-19 pandemic in Arizona, Nguyen signed onto a letter urging Governor Doug Ducey to punish school districts that enforce a mask mandate on students.

Nguyen is anti-abortion, anti-vaccine card, and supports tax cuts. He strongly opposes communism, citing his experience living in Saigon during the Vietnam War. In November 2021, he sponsored House Bill (HB) 2008 that would require the Arizona State Board of Education to update high school civics curriculum to include anti-communist narratives from people who, like Nguyen, fled communist countries. On its initial third hearing, the legislation failed to pass the Senate floor, but on reconsideration, it passed with 16 ayes and 12 nays. Ducey signed it into law on June 17, 2022.

Committee assignments
As of the Fifty-fifth Legislature session, Nguyen serves on the following committees:
 Military Affairs and Public Safety (Vice-Chairman)
 Appropriations
 Education
 Judiciary

Electoral history

Personal life
Nguyen is Catholic. He lives in Prescott Valley with his wife Mai, a registered nurse. Their daughter is in the United States Navy.

References

External links
 Ballotpedia
 Campaign Website
 Legislature Website

American politicians of Vietnamese descent
Republican Party members of the Arizona House of Representatives
1962 births
Living people
21st-century American politicians
California State University, Long Beach alumni
Asian-American people in Arizona politics
Catholics from Arizona
Vietnamese anti-communists
Asian conservatism in the United States